Neptis cormilloti is a butterfly in the family Nymphalidae. It is found on the Comoros.

References

Butterflies described in 1994
cormilloti
Endemic fauna of the Comoros